The Nanda Collection World Tour (also named KPP Nanda Collection World Tour 2014) was the second world tour by Japanese singer Kyary Pamyu Pamyu, in support of her 2013 studio album Nanda Collection.

Setlist
{{hidden
| headercss = background: #ccccff; font-size: 100%; width: 65%;
| contentcss = text-align: left; font-size: 100%; width: 75%;
| header = North America
| content =
Segment 1
"Nanda Collection" (なんだこれくしょん) (Intro)
"Invader Invader" (インベーダーインベーダー)
"Me" (み)
"Ninja Re Bang Bang" (にんじゃりばんばん)
"Kyary ANAN" (きゃりーANAN)
"Furisodation" (ふりそでーしょん)

Intermission
"RGB" (by Capsule); instrumental)

Segment 2
"Pamyu Pamyu Revolution" (ぱみゅぱみゅレボリューション)
"Mottai Night Land" (もったいないとらんど)
"Sungoi Aura" (すんごいオーラ)
"Kura Kura" (くらくら)
"Super Scooter Happy" (Capsule cover)
"Yume no Hajima Ring Ring" (ゆめのはじまりんりん)
"Saigo no Ice Cream" (さいごのアイスクリーム)
"Tsukematsukeru" (つけまつける)

Segment 3
""Kyary no March" (きゃりーのマーチ) 
"Cherry Bonbon" (チェリーボンボン)
"Pon Pon Pon" 
""Fashion Monster" (ファッションモンスター)

Encore
"Candy Candy" 
"Chan Chaka Chan Chan" (ちゃんちゃかちゃんちゃん)
}}

{{hidden
| headercss = background: #ccccff; font-size: 100%; width: 65%;
| contentcss = text-align: left; font-size: 100%; width: 75%;
| header = Australia / Asia / Europe
| content =
Segment 1
"Nanda Collection" (なんだこれくしょん) (Intro)
"Invader Invader" (インベーダーインベーダー)
"Me" (み)
"Family Party" (ファミリーパーティー)
"Ninja Re Bang Bang" (にんじゃりばんばん)
"Kyary ANAN" (きゃりーANAN)
"Furisodation" (ふりそでーしょん)

Segment 2
"Pamyu Pamyu Revolution" (ぱみゅぱみゅレボリューション)
"Mottai Night Land" (もったいないとらんど)
"Sungoi Aura" (すんごいオーラ)
"Kura Kura" (くらくら)
"Super Scooter Happy" (Capsule cover)
"Yume no Hajima Ring Ring" (ゆめのはじまりんりん)
"Saigo no Ice Cream" (さいごのアイスクリーム)
"Tsukematsukeru" (つけまつける)

Segment 1
"Kyary no March" (きゃりーのマーチ) 
"Cherry Bonbon" (チェリーボンボン)
"PonPonPon" 
"Fashion Monster" (ファッションモンスター)

Encore
"Candy Candy" 
"Chan Chaka Chan Chan" (ちゃんちゃかちゃんちゃん)
}}

Tour dates

Notes

Personnel
Kyary Pamyu Pamyu – vocals
Yasutaka Nakata – music
Tempura Kidz - backup dancers

Box office score data

References

External links
Official Tour Site 

2014 concert tours
Kyary Pamyu Pamyu